Equatorial Guinea – United States relations are bilateral relations between Equatorial Guinea and the United States.

History 
The Equatoguinean Government views the U.S. Government and American companies favorably. The United States is the largest single foreign investor in Equatorial Guinea. U.S. companies have the largest and most visible foreign presence in the country. In an effort to attract increased U.S. investment, American passport-holders are entitled to visa-free entry for short visits. The United States is the only country with this privilege. With the increased U.S. investment presence, relations between the U.S. and the Government of Equatorial Guinea have been characterized by a positive, constructive relationship.

Equatorial Guinea maintains an embassy in Washington, D.C., and has received approval for a consulate in Houston, Texas. President Obiang has worked to cultivate the Equatorial Guinea-U.S. relationship with regular visits to the U.S. for meetings with senior government and business leaders.

The 2005 U.S. State Department Human Rights report on Equatorial Guinea cited shortcomings in basic human rights, political freedom, and labor rights. Equatorial Guinea attributes deficiencies to excessive zeal on the part of local authorities and promises better control and sensitization. U.S. Government policy involves constructive engagement with Equatorial Guinea to encourage an improvement in the human rights situation and positive use of petroleum funds directed toward the development of a working civil society. Equatoguineans visit the U.S. under programs sponsored by the U.S. Government, American oil companies, and educational institutions. The Ambassador's Self-Help Fund annually finances a number of small grassroots projects.

In view of growing ties between U.S. companies and Equatorial Guinea, the U.S. Government's overseas investment promotion agency, the Overseas Private Investment Corporation (OPIC), has concluded the largest agreement in Sub-Saharan Africa for a major U.S. project in Equatorial Guinea. The U.S. Agency for International Development has no Equatorial Guinea-related programs or initiatives nor is the Peace Corps present. American-based non-governmental organizations and other donor groups have very little involvement in the country.

Principal U.S. officials include:
 Ambassador--Susan N. Stevenson
 Deputy Chief of Mission—Anton Smith
 Management/Consular Officer—Maureen McGovern
 USAID Contractor-Social Needs—William Gelman

The United States has reopened its full-time Embassy in Malabo (limited function), with the first resident Ambassador in 12 years.

See also 
 Embassy of Equatorial Guinea, Washington, D.C.
 List of ambassadors of the United States to Equatorial Guinea
 Foreign relations of the United States
 Foreign relations of Equatorial Guinea

References

External links
 History of Equatorial Guinea - U.S. relations

 
Bilateral relations of the United States
United States